Gongsun Qiao, died 522 BC, was better known by his courtesy name Zichan (WG: Tzu Ch'an). From 544 BC until his death, he served as the chief minister of the State of Zheng. His ancestral surname was Ji (姬), and clan name Guo (國). As politician of a small but venerable state in central China during the Spring and Autumn period (Chunqiu), he faced not only aggressive larger states, but also the confusion caused by a governing tradition in crisis. Under him the Zheng state managed to grow and prosper. Zichan was responsible for many of its strengthening reforms and his statecraft was often viewed with respect.

Career profile
A grandson of Duke Mu of Zheng, Zichan served as prime minister of Zheng from 544 BC until his death. Under Zichan, the Zheng state managed to grow and prosper. It expanded its territory. This was a difficult task for a small state surrounded by several large states, accomplished toward the end of the Spring and Autumn period.

Reform programs
Zichan was responsible for many reforms that strengthened the state of Zheng. Directly involved in all aspects of the state, Zichan reformulated agricultural and commercial policies, reset the borders, centralized the state, ensured the hiring of capable ministers, and managed the evolution of social norms. He prohibited the public posting of writings and later also the deliver of pamphlets. Yet also Zichan prevented another minister from executing a man for criticising the government, arguing that it was better for the state to listen to opinions from the common people.

From writings of the subsequent Han dynasty historian Sima Qian, his Shiji:

Tzu-ch'an was one of the high ministers of the state of Cheng. ... [T]he state [had been] in confusion, superiors and inferiors were at odds with each other, and fathers and sons quarreled. ... [Then] Tzu-ch'an [was] appointed prime minister. After... one year, the children in the state had ceased their naughty behavior, grey-haired elders were no longer seen carrying heavy burdens... . After two years, no one overcharged in the markets. After three years, people stopped locking their gates at night... . After four years, people did not bother to take home their farm tools when the day's work was finished, and after five years, no more conscription orders were sent out to the knights. ... Tzu-ch'an ruled for twenty-six years, and when he died the young men wept and the old men cried... .Confucius, when appointed chancellor of Lu by its ruler Ting (Duke Ding) was similarly described by this Han historian Sima Qian. Yang and Yang (1979), p.8. Wilhelm (1931), p.23.

The Zuo Zhuan gives us a similar but different version of the public's appraisal of Zichan. After one year the workers complained about new taxes on their clothes and new levy requirements on the lands. Yet after three years the workers praised Zichan: for instructing their children, and for increasing the yield of their fields.

The Zuo Zhuan records that he drafted penal laws to protect private property. He also enacted harsh punishments for criminals. Because of his focus on laws, historians often classify him as a Legalist.

Publishes laws (in 536)
In Zichan's reform of government one major focus concerned the law. Before Zichan, in each state the powerful hereditary clans, descendants of the Zhou lineage, had generally enforced their own closely-held laws and regulations. The legal knowledge might be known only to a "limited number of dignitaries who were concerned with their execution and enforcement." Laws "were not made known to the public." "When the people were kept from knowing the law, the ruling class could manipulate it as it saw fit." Yet the traditional governance among the city-states was then faltering and dissolving in continually changing conditions. In many regimes the ministers, by maneuver or ursupation, were replacing Zhou-lineage clan rulers in whose name they had acted. The ministers began to assume direct state rule of the population. In 536 BC, Zichan had the legal statutes of his Zheng state inscribed on a bronze caldron or ding, and so made public, a first among the Eastern Zhou states. 

Au contraire, a modern view questions this notion that no state had published its laws before the late Chun chiu period. Creel raises doubts that laws were kept secret. He refers to the existence of earlier laws mentioned in ancient writings. Creel mounts a direct challenge to several widely-quoted passages from the Zuo Zhuang that narrate: 1) how Zichan inscribed the Zheng laws on the bronze tripod ding in 536; and, 2) how Confucius criticized the similar publication of laws by a neighboring state in 513. 

Yet the story of Zichan being first to publish remains the modern consensus. Zhao comments how the adverse political situation of Zheng "produced the legendary figure of Zichan, arguably the most influential reformer of his age. [Zichan's] most remarkable act was placing a caldron inscribed with Zheng's legal codes in a public place in 536". Judging by the fierce reaction generated, his action must have been considered "sensational at the time". A law whose text was available to those subject to it, would work to foster their awareness of proper civic conduct. Published laws served the state, 1) as a way of guiding the people, and also 2) as an more effective tool of control, because it warns as well as punishes violators. Zichan "had the complete support of the people of Cheng [Zheng], he enjoyed a position of full authority there throughout his life."

For publishing the laws of Zheng, Zichan was criticized by some of his key contemporaries. It undermined the nobility, undercut their governing authority and their judicial role. Before, in making their legal judgments, the elite officials had applied to the facts their own confidential interpretion of what they viewed as the inherited social traditions. The end result of this shrouded procedure would be very difficult to challenge. By articulating and making public the legal statutes the people were better empowered to advance an opposing view of state law. Up until then ruling circles thought publishing the law would be detrimental, would open the door to public argument, bickering, and shameless maneuvering to avoid social tradition, its time-tested moral force. The situation was multi-sided, aa political roles were changing and the social tradition itself was in flux. Opening up laws to be viewied by the common people would eventually become a trend in ancient Chinese statecraft.

Deng Xi of Zheng (545-501), for good or ill, acquired a reputation for provoking social conflict and civic instability. A child when Zichan published the laws, Deng Xi was a controversial official of Zheng with Mingjia philosophical views. Despite the probable corrosive activities of the Mingjia, Zichan in 536 had an historic bronze ding cast inscribed with Zheng laws, probably penal laws. As Deng Xi came of age, he challenged the state and its ministers, including Zichan. Some thought he studied trickery. The state of Zheng in 501 put him to death. Ancient documents are divided as to who ordered his execution. Most probably it was not Zichan.

A long 'letter' faulting Zichan for making the law public, was written by Shuxiang a minister of Jin and personal friend of Zichan. It marshaled strong traditional arguments against his publishing the penal laws of Zheng. Harshly accusing Zichan of grave error, it predicted future calamity. Both the letter to Zichan and his reply are in the Zuo Zhuang. In response Zichan claims he's "untalented" thus unable to properly manage the laws with a view toward the future generations. To benefit people alive today was his aim. Issues at stake here were long debated, e.g., by philosophers of the Zhan guo era that followed.

Interstate relations
Zichan acted like a highly skilled realist in state-to-state politics. When the State of Jin tried to interfere in Zheng's internal affairs after the death of a Zheng minister, Zichan was aware of the danger. He argued that if Zheng allowed Jin to determine the minister's successor, Zheng lose its sovereignty. He eventually convinced Jin not to interfere in Zheng affairs. 

The Zuozhuan also mentions a summer meeting in 517 shortly after Zochan died. The Jin minister asked about ceremony and  li (ritual propriety) of an official of Zheng, who then recounts a speech by "our former high officer" Zichan. The Zuozhuan quotes it at length. It is the book's "grandest exposition of ritual and its role in ordering human life in accordance with cosmic principles", according to the modern translators. Feng comments on Zichan: "The idea expressed here... is that the practical value of ceremonials and music, punishments and penalties, lies in preventing the people from falling into disorder, and that these have originated from man's capacity for imitating Heaven and Earth."

As a philosopher
Zichan's political thinking is known from his words and actions as a minister of state. The kernels of his thought are thus found in the historical record, often in accounts of his exemplary conduct. His near contemporary Confucius mentioned him. In the next few centuries following his death, several Zhan guo philosophers wrote of him, on occasion creating suggestive contexts for his points of view. Zichan's public life earned him renown in his lifetime and a lasting reputation in ancient Chinese political thought.

Zichan lived in the Chunqiu when "the old order broke down". The people "were bewildered by the lack of standards for settling disputes and maintaining harmonious relationships." The old hereditary houses lost cultural leadership, but the new regimes were fragmented, in constant conflict, and lacked the ready acceptance of customary authority. The era's instability led to an increasingly militant search for new social structures. 

Zichan is "depicted in the Tso-chuan as one of the wisest men of his time, [in his position] as leading statesman in Cheng". Zheng state was under almost constant existential threat from its rival city-states. In his person evidently Zichan practiced the traditional li ceremonies and elite virtues of the fading Zhou dynasty. In his politics, however, Han-era historians could see him as able to anticipate later Zhan guo-era legalist philosophy, i.e., using newly articulated and promulgated standards to enforce state-wide obedience and so to better control events.

Confucius was almost 30 when Zichan died and so likewise was "born in [this] period of great political and social change", a centuries-long revolutionary "upheaval caused by forces beyond his control and already under way." Prof. Creel notes scholarly speculation about the original sources of Confucian teaching; he comments that the Zou Zhuan quotes at length "several statesmen who, living shortly before Confucius... expressed ideas remarkably like his." They were "advanced in their thinking". Creel footnotes analogously to Zichan, but draws no conclusions.

Confucius was said to have spoken well of Zichan, according to the Lunyu:

The Master said of Tsze-ch'an that he had four of the characteristics of a superior man: in his conduct of himself, he was humble; in serving his superiors, he was respectful; in nourishing the people, he was kind; in ordering the people, he was just."Brooks & Brooks (1998), p.105: translation per 5:15 re Zichan ([here romanized as Dž-chǎn, cf.p2). This passage, however, may be an interpolation (added at bk.13) made by Dž-Jīng (c.351-295). A rival (as an heir) to Mengzi (as a meritocratic challenger), Dž-Jīng was the fourth head of the Kung school at Lu (pp. 89, 99, 117 [rivals]; 145 [his death, his son repurposes school], 285, 287, 333 [Kung lineage & school]). Also Kung (Confucius) re Zichan's "elegance" p.120 (14:9). 
 
The Zuo Zhuan quotes at length from the words spoken by Zichan. His thoughts tended to separate the distant domains of Heaven and the near domain of the human world. He argued against superstition and acted to curb the authority of the Master of Divination. He counseled the people to follow their reason and experience. Heaven's way is distant and difficult to grasp; while the human way is near at hand.

The Mengzi of Mencius refers to Zichan. A perplexed disciple questions Mencius about the conduct of Shun, one of the legendary sage kings. Shun's hostile parents and family lied to him. Shun mistakenly believed them, but he did not become corrupt thereby. Shun believed out of his regard for his parents. The life of virtue is discussed. Mencius then compared Shun here to Zichan when he believed a dishonest servant. Given a live fish to keep in a pond, instead the groundskeeper cooked and ate it. He told Zichan, however, it swam in the pond. Zichan was happy that the fish "found his place". Hearing Zichan, the servant mocked his reputation for wisdom. But not Mencius, who concludes: "Thus a noble man may be taken in by what is right, but he cannot be misled by what is country to the way".

Bibliography

Ancient
 Zuo Zhuan, concerning the Chunqiu, translated as 
The Tso chuan. Selections from China's Oldest Narrative History (Columbia University 1989) by Burton Watson; 
The Zuo Tradition (University of Washington 1989), 3 vols., by Stephen Durrant, Li Wai-yee, David Schaberg;
Zuo Tradition/Zuozhuan Reader. Selections (University of Washington 2020), by Durrant, Li, & Schaberg.
 Lunyu of Kong Fuzi, translated as Analects of Confucius: Legge (1861, 1893), Waley (1938), Ames (1998), Brooks (1998).
The Mengzi, the Xunzi,  the Han Feizi, wherein Zhanguo philosophers refer to Zichan.
Lüshi Chunqiu (Master Lu's Spring and Autumn Annals, circa 239).
Shiji by Sima Qian: Two of English translations apparently do not to include the chapter (memoir) on Kong Fuzi. Translations containing it: 
Yang and Yang, Selections from Records of the Historian by Szuma Chien (Peking: Foreign Languages Press 1979), pp. 1–27; 
Richard Wilhelm, Confucius and Confucianism (New York: Harcourt, Brace 1931), pp. 3–70 (annotated).

Modern
Bodde, Derk and Clarence Morris, Law in Imperial China (University of Pennsylvania 1967).
Ch'ũ T'ung-tsu, Law and society in traditional China (Paris: Mouton & Co. 1961).
Creel, H. G., Confucius and the Chinese way (New York: John Day 1949, reprint: Harper 1960).
Creel, Herrlee G., Shen Pu-hai. A political philosopher of the fourth century B.C. (University of Chicago 1974).
Fung Yu-lan, Chung-kuo Che-hsüeh Shih (Shanghai 1931), as A History of Chinese Philosophy, vol. 1 (Princeton Univ. 1937, 2d 1952, 1983) by Bodde. 
Graham, A. C., Disputers of the Tao. Philosophical argument in ancient China (Chicago: Open Court 1989).
Hsu Cho-yun, Ancient China in transition. An analysis of social mobility, 722-222 B.C. (Stanford University 1965)
Kaizuka Shigeki, Koshi (Tokyo 1951); translated as Confucius: His life & thought (New York: Macmillan 1956; Dover 2002), by Bownas.
Lewis, Mark Edward, Honor and Shame in early China (Cambridge University 2021). 
Li Feng, Early China. A social and cultural history (Cambridge University 2013).
Li Jun, Chinese civilization in the making, 1766-221 (New York: St. Martin's 1996).
Lu Xing, Rhetoric in Ancient China (University of South Carolina 1998) 
Pines, Yuri, Foundations of Confucian thought: Intellectual life in the Chunqiu period, 722-453 (University of Hawaii 2002).
Rubin, Vitaly A., Ideologiia i kul'tura drevnego kitaia (Moscow 1970); Individual and State in Ancient China (NY: Columbia University 1976).
Schwartz, Benjamin I., The World of Thought in Ancient China (Harvard University 1985).
Sun Zhenbin, Language, Discourse, and Praxis in Ancient China (Springer 2015).
Walker, Robert Louis, The Multi-state System of Ancient China. (Hamden: Shoestring 1953; Greenwood 1971). 
Zhang Jinfan, The tradition and modern transition of Chinese Law (Heidelberg: Springer 1997, 2d 2005, 3d 2008).
Zhao Dingxin, The Confucian-Legalist State. A new theory of Chinese history (Oxford University 2015).
Articles
Creel, Herrlee G., "Legal institutions and procedures during the Chou dynasty", in Cohen, Edwards, Chen (eds.), Essays on China's Legal Tradition (Princeton University 1980).
Eichler, E. R., "The Life of Tsze-ch'an," in China Review (1886), vol. XV: pp. 12–23 & 65-78.
Fraser, Chris, "School of Names": Deng Xi (2015), in Stanford Encyclopedia of Philosophy Archive.
Puett, Michael, "Ghosts, Gods, and the Coming Apocalypse," in Scheidel (ed.), State Power in Ancient China and Rome (Oxford University 2015)
Theobald, Ulrich, "Zichan" (2010), at ChinaKnowledge website, accessed 2022-07-27.
Turner, Karen, "Sage kings and laws in the Chinese and Greek traditions," in Ropp (ed.), Heritage of China (University of California 1990).
Goldin, Paul R., editor, Routledge Handbook of early Chinese history (Abingdon 2020).

References

See also
Traditional Chinese law
Hundred Schools of Thought

522 BC deaths
Zhou dynasty philosophers
6th-century BC Chinese philosophers
Legalism (Chinese philosophy)
Philosophers of law
Year of birth unknown
6th-century BC Chinese people
Zheng (state)